Pendleton Whisky is a brand of blended Canadian whisky, distilled in Canada, imported and bottled by Hood River Distillers, Inc., of Hood River, Oregon, distributed by Proximo Spirits, and owned by Becle, S.A.B. de C.V.

Pendleton Whisky was created in 2003 to honor the American cowboy and celebrates the tradition of the Pendleton Round-Up, an annual rodeo in Pendleton, Oregon, founded in 1910.  The city of Pendleton, from which the rodeo and whisky derive their names, was named in 1880 in honor of George H. Pendleton, an 1864 Vice Presidential candidate known as a leading opponent of the 13th Amendment to the U.S. Constitution abolishing slavery.

See also

 Alcoholic beverages in Oregon Pendleton is a Canadian blended whisky and since December 2017, has been owned by Mexican beverage conglomerate Becle, S.A.B. de C.V. (Becle, Sociedad Anonima Bursátil de Capital Variable), through its subsidiary, Proximo Spirits, Inc.

References

Further reading
 Wright, Paul (September 8, 2008). "Belly up to the bar: Pendleton tops all Canadian whisky sales in Oregon." East Oregonian. 
 (August 16, 2009.) "Pendleton Whisky fuels growth at Hood River Distillers." East Oregonian. 
 (January 24, 2018) Cuervo Announces Pendleton Whisky Brand Acquisition The Beverage Journal.

External links
 Official website
 Spirits Review Website

Canadian whisky
Hood River, Oregon
2003 establishments in Oregon
Distilleries in Oregon